To the 5 Boroughs is the sixth studio album by the American hip-hop group, Beastie Boys. The album was released on June 14, 2004 internationally, and a day later in the United States. The album debuted #1 on the Billboard 200, becoming the group's third consecutive album to do so, with 360,000 copies sold in its first week and is certified Platinum by the RIAA for sales of over 1,000,000 in the U.S. It was the group's first major release after the September 11 attacks on New York City and reflects on the after-effects.

Release and promotion
The album's lead single "Ch-Check It Out" debuted on The O.C. in "The Strip" from Season 1, airing on April 28, 2004. The album was the cause of some controversy with allegations that it installed spyware when inserted into the CD-ROM of a computer. The band has denied this allegation saying there is no copy protection software on the albums sold in the U.S. and in the U.K. While there is Macrovision CDS-200 copy protection software installed on European copies of the album this is standard practice for all European releases on EMI/Capitol Records released in Europe and it does not install spyware or any form of permanent software.

Singles
The album's first single "Ch-Check It Out" was released on April 28, 2004. The album's second single "Triple Trouble" was released in July 2004. The album's third single "Right Right Now Now" was released in 2004. The album's fourth single "An Open Letter to NYC" was released in November 2004.

Critical reception

The album was met with positive reviews, with an aggregated score of 71 on Metacritic. Playlouder said "To the 5 Boroughs is a triumph." Rolling Stone said "To the 5 Boroughs is an exciting, astonishing balancing act: fast, funny and sobering." Jason Thompson of PopMatters called To the 5 Boroughs "their best album since Paul's Boutique". Tom Sinclair of Entertainment Weekly wrote, "The beats are[...] simple and effective, with a welcome lack of bells and whistles that made Hello Nasty so distracting." AllMusic said: "It's rather impressive that they're maturing gracefully turning into expert craftsmen who can deliver a satisfying listen like this". The NME said: "Like Missy Elliott, the Beasties are re-examining hip hop—what it was, what it is, what it can be". The Onion AV Club said: "With To the 5 Boroughs, Beastie Boys' members discover a musical entryway to an earlier, more innocent era, affording listeners the exuberance of youth along with the hard-won wisdom that can only come with experience." E! Online rated the album as a B− saying it was "fun but hardly fresh.

Track listing

B-sides
"In a World Gone Mad" (2003 Internet single/12" single)
"This Government Needs A Tune Up" (2004 Internet free track))
"...And Then I" ("Ch-Check It Out" UK/Japan/Australia/Canada CD single
"Brr Stick Em" ("Right Right Now Now" Japan CD single)
"Now Get Busy" (2004 Internet single/To The 5 Boroughs Japan bonus)

Charts

Weekly charts

Year-end charts

Certifications

References

External links
 

2004 albums
Beastie Boys albums
Capitol Records albums
Political music albums by American artists